Maretha Maartens (22 June 1945), is a South African author, freelance journalist and editor who writes children's and religious books that deal with the discrimination of blacks, especially of women and children. In 1993, she received an award for children's books of the Catholic Church of Austria.

Biographies
Maretha Maartens was born at Bloemfontein and grew up in Jacobsdal and Petrusburg. She graduated from the University of the Orange Free State and at Stellenbosch University and she obtained a diploma in nursing. Maartens worked as an editor at Finesse magazine.

She is the author of more than 150 books, many of which have been translated into Dutch, English and German.

Maartens has two children, Danila and Naomi, and is married to Hennie Maartens, a pastor.

References

External links 
 Books by Maretha Maartens
 Maretha Maartens' works at amazon.com

1945 births
South African writers
Living people
University of the Free State alumni
Stellenbosch University alumni